Environmental Health Australia (EHA) is the premier professional body for Environmental Health Officers or Environmental Health Practitioners (Public Health Inspectors) in Australia.
Established as a non-profit organisation in 1935, it is governed by a board of nine directors, who elect a national president to be the chairman of the board. The board administers a Constitution and By-Laws that allow six branches (each an independent Association incorporated under their State legislation) of Environmental Health Australia to deliver services to members and feedback to the Board. Branches are based in New South Wales(including Australian Capital Territory), Queensland, South Australia, Tasmania, Victoria, and  Western Australia (Northern Territory members are served by the National office). Each branch has its own Branch Council, and many branches also have sub-groups representing local issues and special interests.

EHA provides the following services to Environmental Health Practitioners:
training workshops,
Conferences (National and Branch),
Environmental Health Policies,
Continuing Professional Development Scheme,
Certified Practitioner Scheme,
Branch-based Achievement awards
Accreditation of Australian Environmental Health University Degrees and Post graduate vocational courses,
Professional Tools (such as the Food Safety Standard of Practice, Australian Food Safety Assessment and education programs such as FoodSafe and I'M ALERT ),
Lobbying to government agencies.

Environmental Health Australia is a member of:
The Commonwealth Government's enHealth Council ,
The Australia Council on Smoking and Health 
The International Federation of Environmental Health

and has previously been a member of important Committees created by:
Standards Australia 
and Food Standards Australia New Zealand 

The name 'Environmental Health Australia' was announced at the International Federation of Environmental Health 10th World Congress, hosted by EHA in May 2008. Previously the organisation had been known as the Australian Institute of Environmental Health, and before that the Australian Institute of Health Surveyors.

External links
Official web site

Professional associations based in Australia
Environmental health organizations
Organizations established in 1935